Lino Gutiérrez (born 26 March 1951) is an American diplomat.

Gutiérrez served as Ambassador to Argentina from September 2003 through July 2006.  He was succeeded by Earl Anthony Wayne. Gutiérrez is currently the Executive Director of the Una Chapman Cox Foundation and an adjunct professor at the Elliott School of International Affairs, George Washington University in Washington, D.C., and the School of Education at Johns Hopkins University.

Foreign service career
Gutiérrez entered the United States Foreign Service in 1977 and served in Latin America, Europe and the Department of State.  He has served as International Affairs Advisor at the National War College (2002), Principal Deputy Assistant Secretary for Western Hemisphere Affairs at the State Department (1999–2001), Acting Assistant Secretary for Western Hemisphere Affairs (2001–2002), United States Ambassador to Nicaragua (1996–1999).

During his tenure as U.S. Ambassador to Argentina, the United States and Argentina signed agreements on counter-terrorism and counter-narcotics cooperation, and container security.  In 2005, Gutiérrez welcomed President Bush to Argentina as he attended the Summit of the Americas.  As Acting Assistant Secretary for Western Hemisphere affairs, Gutiérrez led the Bureau of Western Hemisphere Affairs on September 11, 2001 and beyond.  He accompanied Secretary of State Colin Powell to Lima, Peru for the signing of the Inter-American Democratic Charter, and returned with the Secretary's party to the United States on September 11, 2001.  During his tenure in Nicaragua, Gutiérrez coordinated the U.S. relief effort following the devastation of Hurricane Mitch in October 1998.

Gutierrez also served in Santo Domingo, Lisbon, Port-au-Prince, Grenada, Paris and Nassau. In Washington, Gutiérrez has served as Officer-in-Charge of Nicaraguan Affairs, Officer-in-Charge of Portuguese Affairs, and Director of the Office of Policy Planning, Coordination and Press in the Bureau of Inter-American Affairs.

Gutiérrez is a recipient of the Department of State's Distinguished Honor Award, Superior Honor Award (twice) and Meritorious Honor Award (three times).

Other activities
In 2007, Gutiérrez became CEO of Gutierrez Global LLC, a consulting firm specializing on strategic advice for corporations interested in investing in Latin America and Europe. From 2007 to 2009, Gutiérrez served as Senior Advisor to Secretary of Commerce Carlos Gutiérrez on Cuba transition and Latin America.

In December 2010, Gutiérrez was named Executive Director of the Una Chapman Cox Foundation, which is dedicated to a strong and professional Foreign Service.

Gutiérrez also serves as an adjunct professor at Johns Hopkins University and George Washington University, and serves on the board of Georgetown University's Institute for the Study of Diplomacy.  Secretary of State John Kerry appointed Gutiérrez to the Foreign Service Grievance Board in 2016.

Education and personal life
Gutiérrez is a native of Havana, Cuba. Ambassador Gutiérrez attended the University of Miami and The University of Alabama, where he received a B.A. in Political Science (1972) and an M.A. in Latin American Studies (1976). He was a social studies teacher for the Dade County School System and the Urban League in Miami, Florida before entering the diplomatic services.

Gutiérrez is married to the former Miriam Messina of Santo Domingo, and has three daughters and six grandchildren.

References

External links
 Bio from the website of the U.S. Embassy in Buenos Aires
 
 https://www.amdipstories.org/podcast/lino-gutierrez
 https://www.amdipstories.org/podcast/lino-gutierrez8378140

1951 births
Living people
Ambassadors of the United States to the Bahamas
Cuban emigrants to the United States
Ambassadors of the United States to Argentina
Ambassadors of the United States to Nicaragua
Hispanic and Latino American diplomats
United States Foreign Service personnel
Elliott School of International Affairs faculty
Johns Hopkins University faculty
University of Miami alumni
University of Alabama alumni
20th-century American diplomats
21st-century American diplomats